Les Surveillantes is a French Canadian musical group based in the Saint Boniface district of Winnipeg, Manitoba. Their music integrates many genres, such as folk and indie, and it was inspired from bluegrass. The band has performed across Canada.

They generally mix banjos, guitars and bass with two microphones for the four members. Each member is a singer, instrumentalist, and composer.

History 
The four founding members had played in other Franco-Manitoban groups before 2006. They met at 100NONS, an organization for French music in Manitoba. They began by performing concerts in Saint-Boniface in Manitoba.

After winning the  Festival international de la chanson de Granby public prize and three other awards at the Chant'Ouest tour in 2009, the group became more popular  at  national level.  After their success in the Réseau National des Galas de la chanson, the group toured in Canada and performed at many festivals, including  Coup de Coeur francophone Montreal, and Winnipeg in November 2009, and in  2010 the Festival Vue sur la Relève at Montreal in 2010, the Chicane Albertaine at Nordegg, and the Festival international de la chanson de Granby (out of contest).

In 2011, Les Surveillantes were nominated for a Canadian Folk Music Award and a Western Canada Music Award. They performed at the Festival des cultures francophones de Halifax. In November of that year, Danielle Burke left the band.

Discography 
 Mon grand sapin (single) (2020)
 Feu les artifices (2020)
 La racine carrée du coeur (2010)
 Les Surveillantes (Maxi disque format court) (2009)

Awards 
 Nominated Artiste ou groupe de l'Ouest canadien par excellence, Gala des Prix Trille Or (2011)
 Won Prix SACEF/Place des Arts, Contact Ouest (2010)
 Won Prix du public, Festival International de la Chanson de Granby (2009)
 Won Prix André-Mercure, Chant'Ouest (2009)
 Won Prix Étoile Galaxie, Chant'Ouest (2009)
 Won Prix du public, Chant'Ouest (2009)
 Won Prix du jury, Gala Manitobain de la Chanson (2009)
 Won Prix du public, Gala Manitobain de la Chanson (2009)

See also

 List of bands from Canada

References 
Citations

External links
 Les Surveillantes official website
 Preste.ca 

Musical groups established in 2006
Canadian folk music groups
Musical groups from Winnipeg
Saint Boniface, Winnipeg
2006 establishments in Manitoba